Brian Owen Walpole OBE, FRAeS is a pilot who was the General Manager with responsibility for Concorde with British Airways.

Walpole started his career in aviation by joining the RAF in 1952. In his four years service he served as an operational fighter squadron pilot, flying Meteors and was also a member of the Fighter Command formation aerobatic team, giving displays all over Europe.

In 1956 he joined BOAC, which was later to merge with BEA and become British Airways. Initially as a First Officer on the Argonaut fleet and later he was made the first training co-pilot in BOAC and in 1971 he was promoted to command becoming Fleet Captain of the 707 Fleet in 1972.

In 1975 he commanded the Boeing 707 aircraft used for the Royal Tour to the Far East which Her Majesty the Queen undertook and a year later he transferred to the Concorde Fleet. In 1977, he commanded the Concorde which flew the Queen from Barbados to London and the first supersonic commercial service from London to New York City. His achievements were recognised in 1978 when he was awarded the Britannia Trophy, presented by HRH Prince Charles, the Prince of Wales (now King Charles III), for his work on the launch of the Concorde New York service.

In 1982 he became the General Manager of the Concorde Division at BA and was responsible for all aspects of British Airways Concorde operations, from marketing and advertising to control of the fleet's day-to-day operations.

His achievements in aviation were again recognised in 1983 when he was elected a Fellow of the Royal Aeronautical Society and two years later he was granted the Freedom of the City of London. In 1988 he was appointed an Officer of the Order of the British Empire in The Queen's Birthday Honours List.

In July 1988 Walpole was grounded by British Airways for landing a transatlantic Concorde at Heathrow with 25 minutes of reserve fuel remaining, instead of 30 minutes of reserve fuel.  Walpole had the option to divert to Shannon airport to refuel, but had not done so.

He barrel rolled the Concorde during testing, along with another test pilot, Jean Franchi.

References

External links
Brian Walpole Official Website
British Airways
Royal Aeronautical Society

British aviators
Royal Air Force officers
Officers of the Order of the British Empire
Fellows of the Royal Aeronautical Society
Concorde pilots
Living people
Year of birth missing (living people)